Genoplesium apostasioides, commonly known as the freak midge orchid, is a small terrestrial orchid endemic to New South Wales. It has a single thin leaf fused to the flowering stem and up to fifteen small, yellowish green flowers with a reddish labellum. The flowers do not open widely and are self-pollinating. It grows in heath and shallow moss gardens on rock ledges from the Blue Mountains to Nerriga.

Description
As with others in the genus, the flowers are inverted so that the labellum is above the column rather than below it. There is a callus in the centre of the labellum and extending nearly to its tip. Flowering occurs from December to April.

Taxonomy and naming
The freak midge orchid was first formally described in 1888 by Robert D. FitzGerald who gave it the name Corunastylis apostasioides from a specimen collected near Berrima, and published the description in his book Australian Orchids. In 1989, David Jones and Mark Alwin Clements changed the name to Genoplesium apostasioides.

Distribution and habitat
Genoplesium apostasioides grows in forest and in moss gardens on rock shelves, on the tablelands between the Blue Mountains and Nerriga.

References

External links
 

apostasioides
Endemic orchids of Australia
Orchids of New South Wales
Plants described in 1888